The 1982 WAFL season was the 98th season of the West Australian Football League and its various incarnations. Under the coaching of John Todd, Swans won the 1982, 1983 and 1984 premierships before the financial lure of the VFL deprived it one by one of the stars of this period. The black and whites’ win was marred a little, however, by their decision to play a virtual reserve grade lineup against Richmond in an Escort Cup quarter-final after the game was postponed twice and the VFL Tigers refused to play the match at Subiaco Oval on a Monday afternoon – Richmond won 33.16 (214) to 4.4 (28) and Swan Districts were suspended from the competition until 1985, despite the WAFL approving of their decision after Todd argued it was normal practice among VFL clubs to play reserves players in the Escort Cup.

Although 1982 did not equal the numerous high-scoring records set the previous season, scoring continued high with an average score of 117.86 points per team per game, and featured the highest losing score in League history and the most scoring shots by a losing team in any major Australian Rules competition.

The WAFL also showed concern from the start of the season about declining attendances – a problem that was to lead to radical changes to the structure of Australian Rules in subsequent years. Employment opportunities created by the mining boom in the Pilbara had caused several WAFL players to play in the De Grey league without a clearance during 1981, and the league announced players who did this would be suspended from the WAFL for two full seasons, though none actually were despite Ian Williams playing a practice match on 3 April for Port Hedland Panthers.

Subiaco, depleted by their inability to afford to retain star State of Origin on-baller Gary Buckenara and the absence of league-quality key forwards, set an unwanted record of losing their first sixteen matches, beating by one game their own record from 1902 and that of West Perth in 1939 for the worst start to a season in Western Australian League football. The Lions ultimately became the first one-win WAFL team since Swan Districts in 1968 – their only win was like the 1968 Swans against East Fremantle. Under new president Rod Brown and coach Dennis Cometti West Perth, despite considerable injury problems early in the season, were the one major improver, rising to third and kicking a record finals score in their first major round match for four seasons, in the process becoming the most-watched team in the league and stimulating crowds in a tough season financially.

Season

Round 1

Round 2

Round 3 (Easter weekend)

Round 4

Round 5

Round 6

Round 7

Round 8

Round 9

Round 10

Round 11 (Foundation Day)

Round 12

Round 13

Round 14

Round 15

Round 16

Round 17

Round 18

Round 19

Round 20

Round 21

Ladder

Finals series

First semi-final

Second semi-final

Preliminary final

Grand Final

Notes

References

External links
Official WAFL website
Australian Football: WAFL Season 1982

West Australian Football League seasons
WAFL